Dangle (podstava in Russian intelligence jargon<ref>KGB Lexicon: the Soviet intelligence officer's handbook", Vasiliĭ Ivanovich Mitrokhin (Frank Cass & Co Ltd, London, 2002) p.100</ref> and chèvre in French police and intelligence jargon) is a term used in intelligence work to refer to an agent or officer of one intelligence agency or group who pretends to be interested in defecting or turning'' to another intelligence agency or group. 

The goal of a dangle is to convince the second or foreign intelligence agency that they have changed loyalties by offering to act as a double agent. The dangle then feeds information to their original agency and/or gives disinformation to the second or foreign intelligence agency.

The KGB believed that most dangles: 
 would not come into a USSR government building with sensitive papers
 would not directly ask for money right away instead
 most walk ins would come in saying they wanted to be a spy for ideological reasons to prove their sincerity.

References

Spies by role